Francesco Paolo Masullo (1679 in Acquaviva delle Fonti – 1733 in Acquaviva delle Fonti), was an Italian singer.

He is the son of Antonio Domenico. He studied singing as castrato in 1690 at the Conservatorio della Pietà dei Turchini of Naples. He became maestro di cappella of the Cathedral of Acquaviva delle Fonti in Apulia.

Bibliography 
 Alfredo Giovine, Musicisti e cantanti in Terra di Bari. Biblioteca dell’Archivio delle tradizioni popolari baresi, Bari,  1968, p. 49, .

Italian singers
Castrati
1733 deaths
1679 births